Tom Wood is a British author of thriller novels.  Wood's first published book rights, The Hunter, has been acquired by Studiocanal.

Biography

Early life
Tom was born in Burton Upon Trent in Staffordshire, England, and now lives in London.

Career
Tom Wood has signed a book deal with Berkley Publishing Group (an imprint of Penguin Books) guaranteeing readers at least two more novels after 2016.

In 2020, Wood published a psychological thriller, A Knock at the Door (a non-Victor novel), under the pen-name T.W. Ellis.

Bibliography

Victor the Assassin Series
Victor, as portrayed by the author, is a professional freelance assassin. He is very secretive, his real name and origins are mainly unknown.

As T.W. Ellis

Influences
The Lord of the Rings

References

External links
Official Tom Wood website
Fantastic Fiction Author Page
goodreads Author page
Victor the Assassin series at goodreads
The NewYorker's review of The Hunter
The Publishers Weekly's review of The Hunter

British male novelists
British thriller writers
Writers from London
People from Burton upon Trent
21st-century British novelists
21st-century English male writers
Living people
Year of birth missing (living people)